The Auburn School Department is a school district that is part of the local town government of Auburn, Maine to see to the public school needs of the small city.

The department operates the following schools:

Primary/Elementary Schools serving grades Pre-Kindegarten to 6, except as noted:
 East Auburn Community School
 Fairview Elementary School
 Park Avenue Elementary School
 Sherwood Heights Elementary School
 Walton Elementary School
 Washburn Elementary School which does not offer Pre-Kindergarten 

Junior High school serving grades 7 and 8:
 Auburn Middle School

High schools serving grades 9 to 12:
 Edward Little High School
 Franklin Alternative High School

References

External links 
 The Auburn School Department website

School districts in Maine
Education in Androscoggin County, Maine